is a former Japanese football player.

Playing career
Iwashita was born in Shizuoka Prefecture on April 8, 1973. After graduating from high school, he joined the new club Shimizu S-Pulse, based in his local area, in 1992. He got an opportunity to play little by little during his first season and the club won second place in the 1992 and 1993 J.League Cups. Although he played many matches as forward in 1994, he did not play as often in 1995. In 1996, he moved to the Japan Football League club Vissel Kobe. However he did not in any games. In 1999, he moved to the Japan Football League club Jatco (later Jatco TT). He played often as a regular player and retired at the end of the 2001 season.

Club statistics

References

External links

geocities.jp

1973 births
Living people
Association football people from Shizuoka Prefecture
Japanese footballers
J1 League players
Japan Football League (1992–1998) players
Japan Football League players
Shimizu S-Pulse players
Vissel Kobe players
Jatco SC players
Association football forwards